Stonington is a small unincorporated community located in eastern Baca County, Colorado, United States. Stonington lies east of the Comanche National Grassland and is the southeasternmost community in Colorado.

History

The Stonington post office operated from 1888 until 1992. Stonington addresses are now served by the Walsh post office with the ZIP code 81090.

The Stonington First Methodist-Episcopal Church is located in the community.

In 1940, Stonington's population was 65.

On May 17, 1962, an F1 tornado hit Stonington, destroying several farms.

Climate
According to the Köppen Climate Classification system, Stonington has a semi-arid climate, abbreviated "BSk" on climate maps.

See also

Colorado
Bibliography of Colorado
Index of Colorado-related articles
Outline of Colorado
List of places in Colorado

References

External links

Unincorporated communities in Baca County, Colorado
Unincorporated communities in Colorado